Deborah Mackenzie (born 16 May 1955) is one of four presenters who regularly present the overnight shift on the rolling 24-hour UK news service the BBC News Channel, which is also shown on BBC One and BBC World News during this time.

Early life
She was born on the same day as Hazel O'Connor. Mackenzie was educated at the Guildhall School of Music and Drama, and is a trained voice coach.

Life and career
Before taking up this role Mackenzie appeared on the BBC World Service for a number of years, and also presented several programmes on classical music, such as the BBC Proms from the Royal Albert Hall. Mackenzie is also an occasional visiting lecturer at the University of Westminster.

She is married to Jeff (Regan) and has two daughters Caroline & Rachel and two stepsons Alex & Dan. She lives with Jeff in Kingswood, Surrey.

External links
Deborah Mackenzie Profile

BBC newsreaders and journalists
BBC World Service people
BBC World News
1955 births
Living people
People from Earl Shilton
Alumni of the Guildhall School of Music and Drama
People from Reigate and Banstead (district)